Beyond the Horizon Line is the debut solo album of Lycia front man Mike VanPortfleet, released on September 14, 2004 by Silber Records.

Track listing

Personnel 
Adapted from the Beyond the Horizon Line liner notes.
Mike VanPortfleet – instruments, photography

Release history

References 

2004 debut albums